Dese'Rae L. Stage is an American photographer, writer, speaker, and suicide awareness activist. She created Live Through This, a multimedia series of portraits and true stories of nearly 200 suicide attempt survivors across the United States.

Background 
Stage was born in Miami, Florida. She holds a bachelor's degree in psychology from East Tennessee State University, and is currently studying for her MSW.

Stage survived two suicide attempts: one as a teenager, and one in 2006, at the end of an abusive relationship with a partner. She lost friends to suicide and witnessed the aftermath of a suicide death. These experiences propelled her to begin work on Live Through This in 2010.

Activism 
Stage is known mainly for her work around suicide attempt survivors, but is also outspoken about her experiences with infertility and pregnancy loss.

In 2019, Congresswoman Susan Wild (PA) invited Stage to take part in a roundtable discussion on Capitol Hill called "The Rippling Impact of Suicide", alongside Congresswoman Wild, former NFL player Fred Stokes, and representatives from the suicidology and psychiatry fields. Speaker of the House Nancy Pelosi provided opening remarks and Mike Schlossberg (PA House of Representatives) moderated the discussion.

Live Through This 
Live Through This is a series of portraits and true stories of suicide attempt survivors across the United States. Stage launched the project in 2010, and began interviewing attempt survivors and making portraits in 2011. The inspiration for Live Through This came out of the silence surrounding the experience of suicide attempts. Stage said, "In the years after my most recent attempt in 2006, it felt like I was alone in what I'd been through. I didn't know anyone else who was open about having attempted suicide and lived; all I could find online were statistics, and a handful of anonymous stories wrapped with happy endings like neat little bows. They lacked the warmth of human idiosyncrasy. I couldn't connect." Live Through This gives suicide attempt survivors a platform to talk openly about their experiences with suicidal thoughts and actions. The narratives, which are transcribed and edited for readability, are accompanied by portraits and the survivors' full names. Survivors who have shared their stories represent a broad age range (19 to 69); a variety of socioeconomic, professional, and faith backgrounds; a breadth of trauma and mental health experiences; as well as folks from Black, brown, Latinx, Indigenous, and LGBTQ+ communities. Stage has interviewed and photographed nearly 200 suicide attempt survivors across the country.

Live Through This is used as a training and educational tool in crisis call centers and graduate clinical programs. Stage speaks about Live Through This at suicide prevention events and universities nationwide. Stage and Live Through This played a role in inspiring Mike Faist's in development of the character of Connor Murphy for Tony Award-winning Broadway musical, Dear Evan Hansen. Stage also centers her lived experience of suicidality in her consulting work and collaborations with researchers.

In support of her work with Live Through This, Stage has appeared on Finding Hope: Battling America's Suicide Crisis, a CNN Town Hall with Anderson Cooper; CBS This Morning with Gayle King; Vice News; CBS Evening News and more. Live Through This has received coverage from The New York Times, People, Upworthy, Time and more.

Suicide 'n' Stuff 
Stage produces and co-hosts the video podcast Suicide 'n' Stuff, with colleague Jess Stohlmann-Rainey.

Personal life 
Stage lives in Philadelphia with her wife and two children. She experienced infertility and underwent both intrauterine insemination, IVF, and a miscarriage before conceiving her daughter. She experienced depression and suicidal thoughts during pregnancy. Her wife, who also experienced infertility, carried their son.

Stage was one of the first queer people in New York to marry under the Marriage Equality Act, and one of the first to divorce.

Awards 

 American Association of Suicidology Transforming Lived Experience Award, 2017
 SXSW Community Service Award, 2017
 Investigation Discovery's Inspire a Difference Everyday Hero Award, 2017
 SAMHSA Voice Award, 2015
 Cookie Gant and Bill Compton LGBT Leadership Award, 2014

Filmography 
Dese'Rae appears as the main character in Lisa Klein's 2017 documentary, The S Word. She also appears in Nate Townsend's 2020 documentary, Wake Up: Stories from the Frontlines of Suicide Prevention.

References

External links 

Living people
Suicide prevention
Mental health activists
1983 births
Artists from Miami
American women photographers
21st-century American women